Vráž  is a village and administrative part of Ostředek in Benešov District in the Central Bohemian Region of the Czech Republic. It has 1 inhabitant.

History
The first written mention of the village is from 1406.

References

Neighbourhoods in the Czech Republic
Populated places in Benešov District